Tersilochinae  is a worldwide  subfamily of the parasitic wasp family Ichneumonidae.

Tersilochinae species are koinobiont endoparasitoids of Coleoptera larvae, (although Symphyta larvae are recorded as hosts of one genus). Hosts include Curculionidae and Chrysomelidae so Tersilochinae are used for biological control. There are currently 24 genera and 500 species.

Genera
 Allophroides Horstmann, 1971
 Allophrys Förster, 1869
 Aneuclis Förster, 1869
 Areyonga Gauld, 1984
 Australochus Khalaim, 2004
 Barycnemis Förster, 1869
 Ctenophion Horstmann, 2010
 Diaparsis Förster, 1869
 Epistathmus Förster, 1869
 Gelanes Horstmann, 1981
 Heterocola Förster, 1869
 Horstmannoloehus Gauld, 1984
 Labilochus Khalaim, 2017
 Megalochus Khalaim & Broad, 2013
 Meggoleus Townes, 1971
 Palpator Khalaim, 2006
 Petiloehus Gauld, 1984
 Phradis Förster, 1869
 Probles Förster, 1869
 Sathropterus Förster, 1869
 Spinolochus Horstmann, 1971
 Stethantyx Townes, 1971
 Tersilochus Holmgren, 1859
 Zealochus Khalaim, 2004

References

Further reading
Townes, H.K. (1971): Genera of Ichneumonidae, Part 4 (Cremastinae, Phrudinae, Tersilochinae, Ophioninae, Mesochorinae, Metopiinae, Anomalinae, Acaenitinae, Microleptinae, Orthopelmatinae, Collyriinae, Orthocentrinae, Diplazontinae). Memoirs of the American Entomological Institute 17: 1–372.
Khalaim, A. 2007. First records of Meggoleus, Heterocola and Phradis (Hymenoptera: Ichneumonidae: Tersilochinae) from the Afrotropical region, with description of four new species. African Invertebrates 48 (2): 101–110.
Khalaim, A.I. 2009. South African species of Aneuclis Förster, 1869 (Hymenoptera: Ichneumonidae: Tersilochinae). African Invertebrates 50 (1): 123–136.
Khalaim, A.I. 2013. Afrotropical species of Diaparsis Förster, 1869 (Hymenoptera: Ichneumonidae: Tersilochinae). African Invertebrates 54 (1): 127–159.
Khalaim, A.I. and Sheng, M. 2009. Review of Tersilochinae (Hymenoptera, Ichneumonidae) of China, with descriptions of four new species Zookeys Pensoft

External links
 Bugguide.net
Tersilochinae of the Afrotropical Region Waspweb.org

Ichneumonidae
Apocrita subfamilies